The Orange County Transportation Authority (OCTA) is the transportation planning commission for Orange County, California in the Los Angeles metropolitan area. OCTA is responsible for funding and implementing transit and capital projects for the transportation system for the travel needs, including freeway improvements, express lane management, bus and rail transit operation, and commuter rail oversight.

OCTA was founded in 1991 through the consolidation of seven separate transportation agencies and is governed by a 17-member Board of Directors with the Caltrans District Director serving in a non-voting capacity. The Authority's administrative offices are located in the City of Orange.

History

OCTA's predecessor agency, the Orange County Transit District, was created in August 1972 by a referendum of county voters. It originally started as Santa Ana Transit, a small transit agency with five bus routes operating in Orange County. Santa Ana Transit later merged with other, smaller agencies throughout the county, eventually leading to the formation of OCTD. The routing system was formed over the course of about 15 years and was held in place until the merge to OCTA.

In 1991, OCTA was created under state law, combining the seven separate Orange County agencies that managed transportation planning: Orange County Transportation Commission, Orange County Transit District, Consolidated Transportation Services Agency, Orange County Local Transportation Authority, Orange County Service Authority for Freeway Emergencies, Orange County Congestion Management Agency, and Orange County Service Authority for Abandoned Vehicles.

Park-and-ride facilities, public transportation and other transportation related administrative offices merged into one organization. OCTA administers funds from Measure M (also known as OC Go), a half-cent transportation sales tax. Measure M was originally passed in 1990 and renewed in 2006. It has paid for the expansion on most freeways within Orange County, street improvements and repairs, traffic signal synchronization, and increased Metrolink service.

In 1995, OCTA suffered tremendously during the Orange County bankruptcy and never fully recovered. The agency lost $202 million in revenue over 17 years due to the bankruptcy. As a result, bus service was reduced.

In October 2015, OCTA rebranded its bus services as "OC Bus" and launched the OC Bus 360° plan, which aims to consolidate routes into more frequent service and increase ridership. OCTA also plans to replace 40% of its bus fleet with compressed natural gas-powered vehicles. The change was approved by the OCTA board on February 22, 2016.

In January 2022, OCTA debuted battery-electric buses.

Bus operations

OCTA operates 52 bus routes under the OC Bus brand, encompassing every city in Orange County. Some of the lines also extend to serve the Los Angeles County border communities of Lakewood, La Mirada, Cerritos, Hawaiian Gardens and Long Beach. 

The longest is route 1 (Long Beach–San Clemente) which utilizes Pacific Coast Highway (State Route 1) for the vast majority of its  route, with trips taking an average of 2 to 2.5 hours. South Coast Plaza is the most served location with five OC Bus routes (55, 57, 86, 150 and Bravo! 553).

OCTA also operates six routes under the iShuttle (Irvine Shuttle) brand, serving the cities of Irvine and Tustin. These buses have a different paint scheme and fare structure, but still accept OC Bus passes. These routes connect to Irvine Transportation Center and Tustin station, and have schedules timed to give passengers a smooth transfer to/from Metrolink and Amtrak trains.

Rail operations

Commuter rail

After being tasked by the California Senate to create a joint commuter rail program with other local authorities, the OCTA became a founding member of the Southern California Regional Rail Authority, which later adopted the brand name Metrolink. 

The Orange County Commuter was subsequently transferred to Metrolink, becoming the Orange County Line. Starting in 2005, OCTA has funded greatly expanded service on the Orange County Line, with trains now running twenty hours daily, seven days a week, as often as every 30 minutes. Additional platforms were added at the Fullerton and Laguna Niguel/Mission Viejo stations to accommodate the additional trains.

Metrolink's Inland Empire–Orange County Line began operations in October 1995 between Riverside and Irvine; it was the first suburb-to-suburb commuter rail in the U.S. at the time. The line was later extended and now operates between San Bernardino and Oceanside. 

Metrolink also added a third line through Orange County on May 6, 2002, the 91 Line, later renamed the 91/Perris Valley Line. The service initially operated between Los Angeles Union Station and Riverside–Downtown station via Buena Park, Fullerton, and Corona, roughly paralleling part of the route of the namesake California State Route 91. Limited weekend service began in July 2014. On June 6, 2016, service was extended beyond Riverside to Moreno Valley and Perris–South station in Perris.

OC Streetcar

The western terminus of the proposed route would follow the Pacific Electric right-of-way near the intersection of Harbor Boulevard and Westminster Avenue in Garden Grove, then along street running track on Santa Ana Boulevard into Downtown Santa Ana, where it would reach the Santa Ana Regional Transportation Center at its eastern terminus. In February 2016, $125 million towards the project was included in the proposed United States federal budget for the 2016-17 fiscal year. OCTA began construction in 2018 and plans to open the project in 2023.

Cancelled CenterLine light rail

The CenterLine was a proposed  light rail system serving Irvine, Costa Mesa and Santa Ana. It was originally planned in the 1990s and was intended to open in 2009. Costing $1 billion, it was originally envisioned as a  route that would run from Fullerton to Irvine, through Anaheim, Orange, Santa Ana and Costa Mesa. The route would have served destinations including John Wayne Airport, South Coast Metro, South Coast Plaza, Santa Ana College and downtown Santa Ana.

While OCTA secured funding through Measure M, lack of support from Orange County's congressional representatives resulted in no federal funds obtained for the proposed transit line. In February 2005, the CenterLine was suspended indefinitely, and in May 2005, the plan was officially scrapped in favor of expanding express bus service throughout Orange County and improving existing Metrolink commuter rail service.

Highway and road operations
OCTA is responsible for the Countywide Master Highway Plan, which designates major arterial streets in the county, however, all road maintenance responsibilities fall with the city where the street operates in, or with the county, in the case of unincorporated areas. OCTA street funding is steered towards roadways on the Master Plan in recognition of their role in regional travel.

Recent projects

West County Connectors: In June 2010, OCTA broke ground on the West County Connectors project. The $328 million project is Orange County's largest stimulus project and one of the biggest construction jobs in nearly a decade. It added a 6-mile carpool lane and directly connected the carpool lanes on the San Diego Freeway (I-405) with the San Gabriel Freeway (I-605) and the Garden Grove Freeway (State Route 22). The project also improved and rebuilt three freeway overpasses at Valley View Street, Seal Beach Boulevard and the 7th Street Bridge into Long Beach.

Riverside Freeway (SR-91): This project added a new eastbound lane between the SR-241 in Orange County and the SR-71 in Riverside County, widening bridges and building new retaining and sound walls to reduce traffic noise.

This was the first project in a series of improvements planned for the SR-91. The second project added a new lane in each direction from the SR-55 to SR-241. The third project added a new westbound lane from SR-57 to Interstate 5. The project was completed in 2015.

Orange Freeway (SR-57): Work began in the summer of 2011 on the SR-57 to add a new northbound lane from Orangethorpe Avenue to Lambert. The project was completed in early 2014. Another project, which added a new northbound lane from Katella Avenue to Lincoln Avenue, got underway in early 2012 and was completed by late 2014.

I-5 Gateway Project: Construction began in spring 2006 on the I-5 Gateway project. The four-year project widened the remaining two miles of the I-5 in Orange County from the SR-91 to the Los Angeles County line. The I-5 Gateway project is the final link in the original Measure M's freeway improvement program. The project was completed in 2010.

In addition to freeway improvements, OCTA is in the midst of the most comprehensive rail safety program in the nation that includes a public awareness program regarding safety near the tracks and implementing safety enhancements at more than 50 railroad crossings throughout the county.

The safety enhancements scheduled for completion in 2011 include:
 Upgrades to warning devices in place to advise drivers of train tracks ahead
 Additional gate arms to prevent drivers and pedestrians from crossing the tracks when the gates are lowered and a train is passing
 Extended and raised medians to deter drivers from passing around lowered gates
 Coordinated local traffic signals to prevent vehicles from stalling on the tracks

91 Express Lanes

OCTA owns and operates the 91 Express Lanes, after purchasing them in 2003 from the California Private Transportation Corporation. The express lanes are a four-lane, 10-mile toll road in the median of the Riverside Freeway (SR-91)  between the Orange/Riverside County line and the Costa Mesa Freeway (SR-55).

OCTA purchased the 91 Express Lanes without taxpayer money and removed a "non-compete" clause that prevented safety and traffic flow improvements along the stretch of tollway.

In July 2003, OCTA adopted a toll policy for the 91 Express Lanes based on the concept of congestion management pricing, which is designed to optimize traffic flow at free-flow speeds. The policy calls for dropping and raising tolls based on traffic demand. Traffic volumes are monitored daily and adjusted quarterly.

The other tollways in Orange County are governed by the Transportation Corridor Agencies.

Environmental mitigation
An  restoration project of the  Bee Flat Canyon site was done by Irvine Ranch Conservancy in partnership with OCTA as part of meeting the agency’s mitigation requirements to offset the damage it does to the environment. The project was deemed a success in 2020 by the California Department of Fish and Wildlife and U.S. Fish and Wildlife Service.

See also
List of OCTA Routes
Discontinued OCTA bus routes

References

External links

 OCTA Next Ride Trip Planner

Also See 

 OC Bus
 OC Streetcar
 Metrolink

 
Public transportation in Orange County, California
Government in Orange County, California
Intermodal transportation authorities in California
Transit agencies in California
Transportation in Orange County, California
Bus transportation in California
Passenger rail transportation in California
Toll road authorities of the United States
Transit authorities with natural gas buses
Transportation in Anaheim, California
Transportation in Fullerton, California
Transportation in Orange, California
Transportation in Santa Ana, California
Government agencies established in 1991
1991 establishments in California